Nancowry (Nancoury, Nankwari) is a Nicobarese language spoken on the Nancowry Island in the central Nicobar Islands. It is not mutually intelligible with the other Central Nicobarese languages, and is distantly related to Vietnamese and Khmer,

Phonology

Consonants 

 The labial glide written variously v and w is written ʋ

Vowels

Vocabulary
Paul Sidwell (2017) published in ICAAL 2017 conference on Nicobarese languages.

Morphology
Presence of a coda-copy-infixation system. Stock of lexical roots is reduced by active word taboo and hence rely on derivation extensively.

 kóɲ - 'male, husband'
 ʔumkóɲ -'to turn into a man'
 mumkóɲ - 'eunuch' 
 ʔinkóɲtet - 'widower'
 kóɲu - 'to marry, to have a man'
 kamóɲu - 'married women'

Shared morphological alternations: the old AA causative has two allomorphs, prefix ha- with monosyllabic stems, infix -um- in disyllabic stems (note: *p > h onset in unstressed σ).

 ŋok - 'to eat' / haŋok 'to feed'
 cim - 'to cry' / hacim 'to make someone cry'
 lapəʔ - 'pretty' / lumpəʔ 'to make someone pretty'
 karuʔ - 'large' / kumdruʔ 'to enlarge'

References

Languages of India
Nicobarese languages